The Luxembourg Confederation of Christian Trade Unions, abbreviated to LCGB, is a Luxembourgish trade union.  As the LCGB abides by the principles of Christian social teachings. This is also illustrated by the trade union's motto: Man at the Center of our action.

History
The organisation was established in 1921 as a federation of trade unions.  Its affiliates have since merged into the LCGB, making it a single trade union with various sectoral bodies.

Organisation
By membership, the LCGB is the second-largest trade union in the country, with a little over 40,000 members.  The LCGB has its headquarters not far from the central train station in Luxembourg City.

On the international scale, the LCGB is affiliated to the International Trade Union Confederation (ITUC) and the European Trade Union Confederation (ETUC).

On the regional scale ("Grande Région"), the LCGB is a member of the IGR Saar-Lor-Lux/Trier-Westpfalz, the IRS 3 Frontières and the Plateforme syndicale de la Grande Région (PSGR). As such, two EURES-councillors are working at LCGB.

Former affiliates

Presidents

 Patrick Dury (2011-)
 Robert Weber (1996–2011)
 Marcel Glesener (1980–1996)
 Jean Spautz (1967–1980)
 Pierre Schockmel (1967)
 Léon Wagner (1951–1966)
 Jean-Baptiste Rock (1938–1951)
 Mathias Dossing (1924–1938)
 Michel Wolff (1921–1924)

Footnotes

External links

  
  Official LCGB Blog
  LCGB Youtube Channel

National federations of trade unions
Trade unions in Luxembourg
1921 establishments in Luxembourg
Trade unions established in 1921
Catholic trade unions